Mandurah City Football Club is an Australian professional football club based in Mandurah, Western Australia. Their home ground is Peelwood Reserve in Halls Head.
The club has 300 registered players which also includes Juniors, Social, Women, Semi-pro and Masters teams. They currently (2019) compete in the Football West State League Division 1.

History
Founded in 1970, Mandurah City played their inaugural competitive season in the South West Soccer League, and won the league in 1972. The club then joined the Western Australian Amateur and Social Soccer Association (WASSA), where it remained until 2002. During this period in the amateurs, the club won the amateur championship in 1995 under the guidance of coach Jim Mayers.

In 2002, the club left the amateur ranks and joined the Western Australian Semi professional league and were crowned Division 1 champions in 2007, gaining promotion to the Premier League for the 2008 season.  After four seasons in the top flight, the club was relegated after the 2011 season.

In 2013, the club unsuccessfully applied for entry into the National Premier Leagues Western Australia, and then entered into a rebuilding and restructuring phase. Doug Hesketh was appointed Director of Football and 1st team manager in 2015. Under the NPL structure, promotion and relegation was re-established for the 2016 season; Mandurah City were 2015 Division 1 Champions, but didn't meet all of the Football West eligibility criteria to be promoted. After coming second in the league in the 2016 State League Division 1 it was announced that Mandurah City would compete in the 2017 National Premier Leagues, but they only lasted in the top flight for a single season.

Home ground
The Club's home ground is Peelwood Reserve (known for sponsorship reasons as GenesisCare Stadium), which is one of the premier football stadiums in the league. The venue has hosted a number of A-League friendly matches and the Singapore national team.

Current squad

(vice-captain)
(captain)

References

Black and White – The Official Magazine of Mandurah City FC- Feb 15

External links
 Official Mandurah City Website

Soccer clubs in Perth, Western Australia
Football West State League teams
Association football clubs established in 1970
1970 establishments in Australia
National Premier Leagues clubs